Sagediopsis is a genus of fungi in the family Adelococcaceae.

Species
Sagediopsis aquatica 
Sagediopsis aspiciliae 
Sagediopsis barbara 
Sagediopsis campsteriana 
Sagediopsis epimalvinae  – Falkland Islands
Sagediopsis lomnitzensis 
Sagediopsis pertusariicola 
Sagediopsis vasilyevae

References

Eurotiomycetes genera
Verrucariales
Taxa described in 1921
Taxa named by Pier Andrea Saccardo